Euchrysops lois is a butterfly in the family Lycaenidae. It is found in Somalia, south-western Saudi Arabia, Yemen and Oman.

References

Butterflies described in 1886
Euchrysops
Butterflies of Africa
Taxa named by Arthur Gardiner Butler